Camp Walt Whitman (abbreviated CWW) is a traditional, overnight, and co-educational summer camp located in Piermont, New Hampshire along the shore of Lake Armington. It was founded in 1948 by Arnie and Chick Soloway and has remained in the family; it is today run by Carolyn and Jed Dorfman. It is named after poet Walt Whitman.

The camp's activities include tennis, golf, archery, gymnastics, pottery, hiking, sailing, and others. The majority of campers are Jewish children from the New York metropolitan area, but the camp has no official religious or geographic affiliation. The camp has a return rate between 85% and 90%.

References

External links 
 Camp Walt Whitman website

Walt Whitman
Buildings and structures in New Hampshire
1948 establishments in New Hampshire